Kil'ayim may refer to:

 kil'ayim (prohibition), the multi-faceted prohibition of crossbreeding seeds, crossbreeding animals and mixing wool and linen
 kil'ayim (tractate), a tractate of the Talmud that deals with these laws